Damien Monier (born 27 August 1982) is a French former professional road bicycle racer, who competed as a professional from 2004 to 2022.

Career
Monier was born in Clermont-Ferrand, and became a professional rider in 2004. After seven years with the  team, he won his first race, the 17th stage of the 2010 Giro d'Italia from Bruneck to Peio. In January 2012, he was hit by a car while training in France, knocking him unconscious and fracturing his skull. In November 2012, he signed to ride the 2013 season with the Japanese team .

After retiring as a professional cyclist, he is working as a staff of Aisan Racing.

Major results

2002
 1st  Time trial, National Under-23 Road Championships
2003
 1st  Individual pursuit, National Under-23 Track Championships
 3rd Time trial, National Under-23 Road Championships
2004
 3rd Individual pursuit, National Track Championships
2005
 1st  Individual pursuit, National Track Championships
2007
 8th Tour de Vendée
2008
 1st  Individual pursuit, National Track Championships
 7th Overall Volta ao Distrito de Santarém
2009
 4th Overall Tour Méditerranéen
 4th Overall Tour de l'Ain
 8th Overall Étoile de Bessèges
 9th Overall Circuit de la Sarthe
2010
 1st Stage 17 Giro d'Italia
 8th Overall Route du Sud
 9th Classic Loire Atlantique
2013
 1st JBCF Tsugaike Kogen Hillclimb
 2nd Overall Tour de Hokkaido
 3rd Overall Tour of Japan
 4th Overall Tour of Azerbaijan (Iran)
 6th Overall Tour de Guadeloupe
 9th Overall Tour de Kumano
2014
 2nd Overall Tour de Guadeloupe
 4th Critérium International de Sétif
 5th Overall Tour International de Sétif
 7th Overall Tour de Constantine
1st Stage 3
2015
 1st Taiwan KOM Challenge
 3rd Overall Tour de Filipinas
 3rd Overall Tour de Kumano
 4th Tour de Okinawa
 8th Overall Tour of Japan
 10th Overall Tour de Korea
2016
 1st Overall Tour de Guadeloupe
1st Stage 8b (ITT)
2017
 Tour de Kumano
1st Points classification
1st Stage 3
 5th Overall Tour de Korea
2018
 3rd Taiwan KOM Challenge
2019
 9th Overall Tour de Ijen

Grand Tour general classification results timeline

References

External links

 

French male cyclists
1982 births
Living people
Sportspeople from Clermont-Ferrand
French Giro d'Italia stage winners
Cyclists from Auvergne-Rhône-Alpes